John H. Willis (politician), Arizona politician, member of the 1st Arizona State Legislature.
 John Harlan Willis (1921–1945), Congressional Medal of Honor recipient